Tsunami Surge is a water coaster located in Six Flags Hurricane Harbor Chicago, in the Riptide Bay area that opened on May 29, 2021. Announced in 2019, the water coaster suffered a delay following the effects of the park's closure and construction delays relating to the COVID-19 pandemic.

History 
On August 29, 2019, Six Flags Great America announced Tsunami Surge, in which the park claims as the tallest water coaster in the world. The attraction would be located across from Maxx Force, utilizing the former Pictorium site. As the 25th attraction at the water park, Tsunami Surge would utilize "AquaLucent" effects.

More plans were announced at the American Coaster Enthusiasts' No Coaster Con event on January 18, 2020, in which the park announced that groundbreaking was in early-January, and had released the renderings for the attraction. Later in March of that year, the park had temporarily paused construction due to the COVID-19 pandemic.

After the announcement that Six Flags Hurricane Harbor Chicago would be separate from Six Flags Great America, the park confirmed that Tsunami Surge would be opening for the 2021 season. Soft opening for the attraction began on May 27, 2021, for the media, and the attractions grand opening was on May 29, 2021.

Ride description 
After the second blast, the ride turns into a helix before its turn into the final uphill blast. After two turns, the ride has two pre-drops, before dropping into a splashdown section.

In total, the water coaster features five turns, five drops and three uphill blasts. The attraction utilizes "AquaLucent" effects during each turn, which create "bursts of colors" and "dreamlike patterns" during the turns.

Awards 
Six Flags Hurricane Harbor Chicago, WhiteWater West and Ramaker won an award for the Leading Edge Award in August 2021 by the World Waterpark Association for their work on the attraction. Additionally, the next month, the ride placed third place in Best New Water Slide on Amusement Today's Golden Ticket Awards.

References

External links 
 Official website

Six Flags Great America
Water rides
Amusement rides introduced in 2021
Operating amusement attractions